Carpathia FC is an American soccer club based in Sterling Heights, a suburb of Detroit that plays in the National Premier Soccer League. It currently plays its home matches at Avondale High School in Auburn Hills, Michigan.

History
The Carpathia Kickers Soccer Club was founded in 1952 and comprises over 40 youth and adult teams.

In 2015, the club applied to and gained entry to the Premier League of America.  Its men's team was admitted and joined the league for 2016.

Stadium
Carpathia FC will play its home games at Carpathia Club in Sterling Heights, MI and L'Anse Creuse High School North in Macomb Township, MI.

Current roster

Head coaches
  Bruce Wilden (2016–2019)

Year-by-year

References

External links
 Official website
 Facebook
 Twitter

United Premier Soccer League teams
Association football clubs established in 1952
Soccer clubs in Michigan
Premier League of America teams
1952 establishments in Michigan